The Gold of Taranto (Ori di Taranto) refers to a collection of jewels from the Hellenistic and 
Roman periods. The jewels include gold rings, earrings, and bracelets. The collection is at the National Archaeological Museum of Taranto in Italy.
The collection has been displayed in various parts of the 
world. 
 
The collection includes:

 Diadema from Canosa in gold and semi-precious stones with floral motifs decoration;
 Lion head earrings;
 Boat shaped earrings;
 Nutcracker;
 Silver case from Canosa shaped like a shell.

The jewels represent the historical craftsmanship and the techniques used at the Magna Graecia, the coastal areas of Southern Italy, between the 4th and 1st centuries BC.

Sources
 
 
 Amelia D'Amicis, Laura Masiello "Ori del Museo nazionale archeologico di Taranto" Scorpione 2007

Notes

Treasure troves of Italy
Taranto
Ancient Roman jewellery